Raúl Arias Rosas (born 29 October 1957) is a Mexican former professional footballer and manager. He is the current manager for Liga Nacional club Achuapa.

Career
He played with various clubs, including Tampico Madero, Atletico Potosino, Club Puebla, Tigres UANL, Club León, Atlante F.C., Cruz Azul, Correcaminos UAT and once again with Club Puebla, where he officially retired. He won the 1982–83 league title with Puebla where he is still remembered for being a great defensive player. After he retired he took up coaching, and coached Club Necaxa from 1998 to 2005. He led Necaxa to third place in the 2000 FIFA Club World Championship. In 2006, he coached San Luis till 2009 when he returned to coach Club Necaxa who would eventually be relegated to the second division. In 2009, he had a short stay with Chivas.

International
Raul was capped twice for the Mexico national team he played versus Canada and Martinique. he scored his first goal in a 5–0 win versus Canada in the Estadio Sergio León Chávez on 3 December 1983

Honours

Player
Puebla
Mexican Primera División: 1982–83

Manager
Necaxa
Mexican Primera División: Invierno 1998
CONCACAF Champions' Cup: 1999
FIFA Club World Cup Third Place: 2000

References

External links

1957 births
Living people
Footballers from Mexico City
Association football defenders
Mexico international footballers
Tampico Madero F.C. footballers
Atlético Potosino footballers
Club Puebla players
Tigres UANL footballers
Club León footballers
Atlante F.C. footballers
Cruz Azul footballers
Correcaminos UAT footballers
Mexican football managers
Club Necaxa managers
San Luis F.C. managers
C.D. Guadalajara managers
Tecos F.C. managers
Cienciano managers
Mexican expatriate football managers
Expatriate football managers in Peru
Mexican expatriate sportspeople in Peru
Mexican footballers